Xinjiang Astronomical Observatory (XAO) of the Chinese Academy of Sciences was known as Ürümqi Astronomical Observatory before it was renamed in January 2011.

The current research at XAO spans many fields of astronomy. It consists of radio astronomy, optical astronomy and applications of astronomy, especially pulsars, star formation and evolution, galaxies and cosmology, high energy astrophysics, microwave receiver, digital technology, GPS, and so on. The Radio Astrophysics Laboratory of XAO is a member of the radio astronomy key laboratories in the Chinese Academy of Sciences, and has also been awarded the status of Key Laboratory of Xinjiang Uygur Autonomous Region. XAO operates the Nanshan site, Kashgar site, Qitai site and other two independent ground stations.

Facilities
The observatory's facilities include the Nanshan Radio Telescope (see List of radio telescopes#Asia), located in Gangou Township, Ürümqi County. The 25 m, telescope site in Nanshan of XAO is one of the important stations of Very-long-baseline interferometry (VLBI). As a crucial research base for pulsar, centimeter wave molecular line and active galactic nuclei research, Nanshan station is also involved and plays an important role in China's Lunar Exploration Program.

Plans also exist for the construction of a large, fully steerable single-dish radio telescope (diameter 110 m), which is called Qitai Radio Telescope, or QTT for short. The chosen site for the facility is in Banjiegou Town, Qitai County. Upon completion, the sensitivity of 110 m antenna is about 20 times more than a 25 m telescope.

On July 15, 2012, the groundbreaking ceremony took place at Banjiegou for the Xinjiang Qitai Astronomical and Science Education Base, which is presumably the facility that will house the telescope.

Programs
XAO has held a wide range of interesting public science popularization since it was set up. Popular science in XAO comprises Star Party for the public, Field Trip for students, Astronomers Get into Campus, free camps for children who live in remote poverty-stricken areas, Open House Day and so on. The results of spreading public science depend not only on our ability but also on our willingness to give.

International collaboration is an important channel for XAO to promote the development of astronomy, astrophysics and other related fields of science. So far, XAO has already established friendly relationship with America, Australia, Netherland, Japan, Germany, England, Italy, Russia, Sweden, Taiwan and Hong Kong. Besides, has also established a good partnership with domestic scientific research institutions as well as universities.

XAO has more than 100 staff, including 87 scientific and technical personnel, 19 management personnel, also hired 2 foreign professor emeritus and experts from well known universities and research institutions as our guest professors.

See also
 List of astronomical observatories

Notes

External links

Astronomical observatories in China
Buildings and structures in Ürümqi
Research institutes of the Chinese Academy of Sciences
Education in Xinjiang